Xai or XAI may refer to:

 Explainable Artificial Intelligence, in artificial intelligence technology
 Xai-Xai, a city in the south of Mozambique
 XAI, the IATA airport code for Xinyang Minggang Airport, in Xinyang, China
 xai, the ISO 639-3 language code of Kaimbé language, an extinct language in Brazil.

See also